Sainik School, Chittorgarh, established in 1961, is a CBSE-affiliated fully residential English-medium 
School functioning under the aegis of the Sainik Schools' Society, Ministry of Defence, Government of India, located at Chittorgarh, Rajasthan, India.

It is one of several Sainik Schools. The school prepares students for entry into the National Defence Academy. The School is affiliated with CBSE.
It was ranked 3rd best Boys Boarding School all over India in 2019-20.

NCC (National Cadet Corps) training is compulsory.

References

External links
 http://www.sschittorgarh.com/

Schools in Rajasthan
Sainik schools
Military high schools
Boys' schools in India
Educational institutions established in 1961
Education in Chittorgarh district
Boarding schools in Rajasthan
1961 establishments in Rajasthan